To be used efficiently, all computer software needs certain hardware components or other software resources to be present on a computer. These prerequisites are known as (computer) system requirements and are often used as a guideline as opposed to an absolute rule. Most software defines two sets of system requirements: minimum and recommended. With increasing demand for higher processing power and resources in newer versions of software, system requirements tend to increase over time. Industry analysts suggest that this trend plays a bigger part in driving upgrades to existing computer systems than technological advancements.  A second meaning of the term of system requirements, is a generalisation of this first definition, giving the requirements to be met in the design of a system or sub-system.

Recommended system requirements 

Often manufacturers of games will provide the consumer with a set of requirements that are different from those that are needed to run a software. These requirements are usually called the recommended requirements. These requirements are almost always of a significantly higher level than the minimum requirements, and represent the ideal situation in which to run the software. Generally speaking, this is a better guideline than minimum system requirements in order to have a fully usable and enjoyable experience with that software.

Hardware requirements 

The most common set of requirements defined by any operating system or software application is the physical computer resources, also known as hardware, A hardware requirements list is often accompanied by a hardware compatibility list (HCL), especially in case of operating systems. An HCL lists tested, compatible, and sometimes incompatible hardware devices for a particular operating system or application. The following sub-sections discuss the various aspects of hardware requirements.

Architecture 

All computer operating systems are designed for a particular computer architecture. Most software applications are limited to particular operating systems running on particular architectures. Although architecture-independent operating systems and applications exist, most need to be recompiled to run on a new architecture. See also a list of common operating systems and their supporting architectures.

Processing power 

The power of the central processing unit (CPU) is a fundamental system requirement for any software. Most software running on x86 architecture define processing power as the model and the clock speed of the CPU. Many other features of a CPU that influence its speed and power, like bus speed, cache, and MIPS are often ignored. This definition of power is often erroneous, as different makes and models of CPUs at similar clock speed often have different throughput speeds.

Memory 

All software, when run, resides in the random access memory (RAM) of a computer. Memory requirements are defined after considering demands of the application, operating system, supporting software and files, and other running processes. Optimal performance of other unrelated software running on a multi-tasking computer system is also considered when defining this requirement.

Secondary storage 

Data storage device requirements vary, depending on the size of software installation, temporary files created and maintained while installing or running the software, and possible use of swap space (if RAM is insufficient).

Display adapter 

Software requiring a better than average computer graphics display, like graphics editors and high-end games, often define high-end display adapters in the system requirements.

Peripherals 

Some software applications need to make extensive and/or special use of some peripherals, demanding the higher performance or functionality of such peripherals. Such peripherals include CD-ROM drives, keyboards, pointing devices, network devices, etc.

Software requirements 
Software requirements deal with defining software resource requirements and prerequisites that need to be installed on a computer to provide optimal functioning of an application. These requirements or prerequisites are generally not included in the software installation package and need to be installed separately before the software is installed.

Platform 

A computing platform describes some sort of framework, either in hardware or software, which allows software to run. Typical platforms include a computer's architecture, operating system, or programming languages and their runtime libraries.

Operating system is one of the requirements mentioned when defining system requirements (software). Software may not be compatible with different versions of same line of operating systems, although some measure of backward compatibility is often maintained. For example, most software designed for Microsoft Windows XP does not run on Microsoft Windows 98, although the converse is not always true. Similarly, software designed using newer features of Linux Kernel v2.6 generally does not run or compile properly (or at all) on Linux distributions using Kernel v2.2 or v2.4.

APIs and drivers 

Software making extensive use of special hardware devices, like high-end display adapters, needs special API or newer device drivers. A good example is DirectX, which is a collection of APIs for handling tasks related to multimedia, especially game programming, on Microsoft platforms.

Web browser 

Most web applications and software depend heavily on web technologies to make use of the default browser installed on the system. Microsoft Edge is a frequent choice of software running on Microsoft Windows, which makes use of ActiveX controls, despite their vulnerabilities.

Other requirements 

Some software also has other requirements for proper performance. Internet connection (type and speed) and resolution of the display screen are notable examples.

Examples 

Following are a few examples of system requirement definitions for popular PC games and trend of ever-increasing resource needs:

For instance, while StarCraft (1998) requires:

Doom 3 (2004) requires:

Star Wars: The Force Unleashed (2009) requires:

Grand Theft Auto V (2015) requires:

See also 

 Requirement
 Requirements analysis
 Software Requirements Specification
 Specification (technical standard)
 System requirements specification (SyRS)

References 

Software requirements